Bactrianoscythris drepanella is a moth of the family Scythrididae. It was described by Pietro Passerin d'Entrèves and Angela Roggero in 2009. It is found in Afghanistan.

References

Bactrianoscythris
Moths described in 2009
Moths of Asia